Gaudryceratidae is a family belonging to the extinct ammonoid suborder Lytoceratina that lived from the Barremian of the Lower Cretaceous to the Maastrichtian of the Upper Cretaceous.

Gaudryceratids are lytocerins typically with rounded, oval, or depressed whorl sections that become  higher with age; suture with more or less symmetrical, bifid saddles, internal suture with a single saddle.

References 

 Arkell et al., Mesozoic Ammonoidea. Treatise on Invertebrate Paleontology, Part L. Geological Society of America, 1957. RC. Moore, ed.
Gaudryceratidae-Paleobiology Database 9/24/07

Ammonitida families
Lytoceratina
Barremian first appearances
Maastrichtian extinctions